International Association of Operative Millers (IAOM) is an international organization founded in 1896 which promotes the advancement of education and training opportunities in the grain milling industries. The group was formerly known as the Association of Operative Millers. IAOM is based in Overland Park, Kansas, United States.

The association and its member districts regularly hold meetings.

References

External links
International Association of Operative Millers
 International Association of Operative Millers, Mideast and Africa District

Flour
Organizations established in 1896
Trade associations based in the United States
Food industry trade groups